Osmia sanrafaelae is a megachilid bee first identified in Utah's San Rafael Desert. The species' range is limited to the American intermountain West. O. sanrafaelae is a solitary nester that inhabits a wide range of ecosystems: pinyon-juniper scrubland, washes, sand dunes, and desert flatlands.

Osmia sanrafaelae measure  in length.

References 

sanrafaelae
Hymenoptera of North America
Insects of the United States
Endemic fauna of the United States
Insects described in 1985